Melvin Howard "Mel" Becket, (1929 – December 9, 1956) was an American college football and professional Canadian football player, and was one of 62 people who died on Trans-Canada Air Lines Flight 810, on December 9, 1956.

Becket played his entire four-year professional football career as a tight end and center for the Saskatchewan Roughriders of the Western Interprovincial Football Union, and his  40 jersey is one of eight that has been retired by the club.

College career 
Becket played college football for the Indiana University Hoosiers from 1947 to 1951.

Professional career 
Following college, Becket was drafted in the 8th round of the 1952 NFL Draft by the Green Bay Packers.   Becket spurned the NFL and instead signed with the WIFU Saskatchewan Roughriders, where he starred for four years.  He was named a Western All-Star in 1956, and was on his way back to Regina, Saskatchewan, on Flight 810 after playing in the East–West All-Star game in Vancouver, British Columbia, on December 8, 1956.

Death 
Becket, along with Roughriders teammates, Mario DeMarco, Gordon Sturtridge, and Ray Syrnyk, were passengers on Flight 810 with another WIFU player, Calvin Jones, of the Winnipeg Blue Bombers.  All five players were present at the 1956  All-Star game in Vancouver, British Columbia, and were headed back to their respective teams' home cities.  The five players were accompanied by 54 other passengers, which included 1 football official, and 3 crew members, who all lost their lives in Western Canada's worst aviation disaster on December 9, 1956, on Slesse Mountain (Mount Slesse) near Chilliwack, British Columbia. The crash is the subject of the 2012 documentary The Crash, part of TSN's Engraved on a Nation series of eight documentaries celebrating the 100th Grey Cup.

Legacy 
Since 1957, in memory of Becket and his teammate Mario DeMarco, the DeMarco-Becket Memorial Trophy has been annually awarded to the most outstanding lineman in the CFL's West Division.

References

1929 births
1956 deaths
Players of Canadian football from Chicago
American football tight ends
Indiana Hoosiers football players
American players of Canadian football
Canadian football offensive linemen
Saskatchewan Roughriders players
Accidental deaths in British Columbia
Victims of aviation accidents or incidents in Canada
Victims of aviation accidents or incidents in 1956
Players of American football from Chicago